Charles Percy McGahey (12 February 1871 – 10 January 1935) was an English cricketer who played first-class cricket for Essex between 1894 and 1921. McGahey also played for London County between 1901 and 1904 and was named as one of the Wisden Cricketers of the Year in 1902. McGahey played two Test matches for England during Archie MacLaren's tour of Australia in 1901-02.

McGahey played association football for Clapton, one of the leading amateur clubs of the day.

McGahey died from sepsis in a finger, which he damaged after slipping on a wet pavement.

References

External links

1871 births
1935 deaths
England Test cricketers
English cricketers
Essex cricketers
Essex cricket captains
London County cricketers
Wisden Cricketers of the Year
Gentlemen of the South cricketers
Marylebone Cricket Club cricketers
North v South cricketers
Gentlemen cricketers
East of England cricketers
Deaths from sepsis
Gentlemen of England cricketers
English footballers
Clapton F.C. players
Association footballers not categorized by position
Wembley Park cricketers
Earl De La Warr's XI cricketers
W. G. Grace's XI cricketers